The 4 × 200 metres relay is an athletics track event in which teams comprise four runners who each complete 200 metres or half a lap on a standard 400 metre track.  The event is a world record eligible event, but is not a standard event at most track meets, though certain leagues regularly conduct this event as part of their program.

Description
There are multiple formats under which the race can be conducted.

If the track is marked for a four-turn stagger format, the runners can stay in their lanes throughout the race. In this case the outer lanes could appear to start 2/3 of the way through the first turn. The markings for such a special zone should be colored red, though many tracks deviate from the standard marking colors.
On a conventionally marked track, the race can be run starting at the normal 400 metre (and 4 × 100m relay) start line. As a two-turn stagger, the first exchange would take place in the standard second passing zone of the 4 × 100m relay, the second pass taking place in the normal (lane one, extended) 4 × 400m relay zone. After that exchange, the runner would break into lane one and make a third exchange in lane one of the second standard 4 × 100m relay zone.
Indoors, the event is popular because each leg is one lap of a standard 200m indoor track.

World record

The men's world record was set in 2014 at the inaugural IAAF World Relay Championships in Nassau, Bahamas. The record was set by a Jamaican team consisting of Nickel Ashmeade, Warren Weir, Jermaine Brown and Yohan Blake in a time of 1:18.63.  The women's world record is 1:27.46, set by a squad called Team USA "Blue" LaTasha Jenkins, LaTasha Colander-Richardson, Nanceen Perry, and Marion Jones on April 29, 2000, at the Penn Relays in Philadelphia, Pennsylvania.

European record

Men  Italy: 1:21.10 (Stefano Tilli, Carlo Simionato, Giovanni Bongiorni, Pietro Mennea),  Cagliari 29 September 1983
Women  East Germany: 1:28.15 (Marlies Göhr, Romy Schneider-Müller, Bärbel Eckert-Wöckel, Marita Koch,   Jena 9 August 1980

All-time top 25

Men
Updated March 2020.

A USA team of Shawn Crawford, Ramon Clay, Darvis Patton and Justin Gatlin ran 1:19.16 at the Penn Relays in Philadelphia on 26 April 2003 but the performance was annulled due to the use of performance enhancing drugs by Ramon Clay

Women
Updated March 2022.

Notes

References

External links
IAAF list of 4x200-metres-relay records in XML

 
Track relay races